William Harrower (9 October 1861 – 27 October 1910) was a Scottish footballer who played for Queen's Park and Scotland as an inside forward.

In three matches for the national team he scored four goals. He scored in each of his international participations, helping Scotland to win by a margin (3 goals or more) every time.

Harrower died early, at the age of 49.

Honours

Club
Queen's Park
Scottish Cup: 1882, 1884, 1886
Glasgow Merchants Charity Cup: 1883, 1884, 1885

International
Scotland
British Home Championship: 1883–84,  1885–86 (shared)

References

External links

International stats at londonhearts.com

1861 births
1910 deaths
Scottish footballers
Association football inside forwards
Scotland international footballers
Footballers from Glasgow
Place of death missing
Queen's Park F.C. players
FA Cup Final players